Snoopy is a dog in the comic strip Peanuts by Charles M. Schulz.

Snoopy may also refer to:
 Snoopy (band), Dutch disco duo of the late 1970s
 Snoopy (artist), Quincy Delight Jones III (born 1968), a Swedish-American producer and author
 Snoopy (video game), a 1984 game by Radarsoft
 Snoopy, an Australian human-powered airship
 Snoopy, Lunar Module for Apollo 10

See also
Snoop (disambiguation)
Snooping (disambiguation)